The Stuart number (N), also known as magnetic interaction parameter, is a dimensionless number of fluids, i.e. gases or liquids.

It is defined as the ratio of electromagnetic to inertial forces, which gives an estimate of the relative importance of a magnetic field on a flow. The Stuart number is relevant for flows of conducting fluids, e.g. in fusion reactors, steel casters or plasmas.

Definition

 B – magnetic field
 Lc – characteristic length
 σ – electric conductivity
 U – characteristic velocity scale
 ρ – density 
 Ha – Hartmann number
 Re – Reynolds number

References

Further reading
 R. Moreau: Magnetohydrodynamics (= Fluid Mechanics and its Applications. Vol. 3). Kluwer Academic Publishers, Dordrecht u. a. 1990, S. 127.
 P. A. Davidson: An Introduction to Magnetohydrodynamics. Cambridge University Press, Cambridge 2001, S. 97.

Dimensionless numbers of thermodynamics
Fluid dynamics
Magnetohydrodynamics